High School Musical: The Concert  was a concert tour performed by members of the cast of the popular television film series, High School Musical, sponsored by AEG Live and presented by Buena Vista Concerts. The concert toured cities in the United States, Canada and Latin America. High School Musical: The Concert expanded the Disney Channel franchise that had previously produced a triple-platinum selling soundtrack and had planned a movie sequel. (Disney had recently scored a success with another concert based on a TV musical by The Cheetah Girls, who had a sold-out tour in 88 cities)

The films' original cast members Vanessa Hudgens, Ashley Tisdale, Lucas Grabeel, Corbin Bleu and Monique Coleman took part in the tour, except for Zac Efron, who had a previous engagement filming Hairspray and was replaced by Drew Seeley, who was Efron's singing voice in the first film.

The tour also served to promote the debut album of three members: V by Vanessa Hudgens, Headstrong by Ashley Tisdale and Another Side by Corbin Bleu.

Development

The concert, which featured songs from the film, also included cast members Vanessa Hudgens, Ashley Tisdale, Lucas Grabeel, Corbin Bleu and Monique Coleman. Zac Efron was the only original cast member absent from the tour due to his previous engagement to the filming of the 2007 film adaptation of the Broadway musical Hairspray. Instead, Drew Seeley, Efron's singing voice in the first film and co-writer of "Get'cha Head in the Game", joined the tour in Efron's place. Jordan Pruitt joined the tour as the opening act. Kenny Ortega, the film's director and choreographer, became the show's touring producer, creative director and director. On the night of the last concert, as seen on YouTube, the cast introduced him before singing the final chorus of "We're All in This Together". The concert typically ran two and a half hours (150 minutes) including the opening act and intermission.

The cast toured four countries in South America: Argentina, Chile, Brazil and Venezuela. Each of the singers had two microphones during the performances: a headset microphone with a nude-colored pad on the tip, and a handheld microphone. The live version of "Start of Something New" recorded at the Houston concert appeared in the Radio Disney Jams Vol. 9 CD. Erin Lareau designed the costumes for the concert tour. "Dance with Me" (from The Cheetah Girls 2, also directed by Kenny Ortega with choreography by Ortega and Charles Klapow) included an extended guitar solo which allowed Monique Coleman to feature in an extended tango number with both backup dancers Jared Murillo and Seeley. Murillo also choreographed "Dance with Me".

Telecasts and recordings
 
On May 26, 2007, Disney Channel Latin America showed the concert made in Buenos Aires in Argentina. This performance aired none of Ashley Tisdale's songs, and Vanessa Hudgens only sang "Come Back To Me". On June 9, 2007, Canal 13 showed the concert performed in Santiago, Chile, airing all the solo performances. On June 10, 2007, the concert filmed in Mexico City, Mexico aired on Disney Channel Latin America. 

The concert CD/DVD came from a performance in Houston, Texas on December 18, 2006 at the Toyota Center. The album and video was released on June 26, 2007. While the CD and DVD were recorded by Disney at the same show, the two feature slightly alternate edits. For example, when Lucas thanks the cast and crew at the end of "We're All in This Together", he says: "Houston, you have been awesome" and thanks the band on the CD version, while the DVD version skips straight into thanking the cast and dancers. He thanks Jordan Pruitt in real life, but on both the CD/DVD combo and the Extreme All-Access Pass DVD, he never does. The same incident occurred with Lucas introducing the cast at the beginning of the show. In real life, he addressed the fact that Efron couldn't make it on stage but on DVD and CD, he never does.

Opening acts
 Jordan Pruitt (all tour dates)

Set list

{{hidden
| headercss = background: #ccccff; font-size: 100%; width: 65%;
| contentcss = text-align: left; font-size: 100%; width: 75%;
| header = Main setlist
| content =

"Introduction" (contains excerpts of "Start of Something New", "Stick to the Status Quo", and "We're All in This Together")
"Start of Something New"
"Stick to the Status Quo"
"I Can't Take My Eyes Off You"
"When There Was Me and You"
"Headstrong" 
"We'll Be Together" 
"He Said She Said" 
"Get'cha Head in the Game"
"Dance With Me" (Drew Seeley solo)
"Push it to the Limit" 
"Marchin'" 
"What I've Been Looking For" (Reprise)
"What I've Been Looking For"
"Let's Dance" 
"Say OK" 
"Come Back To Me" 
"Bop to the Top"
"Breaking Free"
Encore
"We're All in This Together"
}}

Shows

Other media

Live album

CD (CD / DVD released on May 1, 2007)
Disc 1 [CD]
"Start of Something New" – Drew & Vanessa ft. Ashley, Lucas, Corbin, & Monique
"Stick to the Status Quo" – Ashley, Lucas, & Cast
"I Can't Take My Eyes Off Of You" – Drew, Vanessa, Ashley, Lucas, Corbin, & Monique
"When There Was Me And You" – Vanessa
"Get'cha Head In The Game" – Drew & Corbin (with backup dancers)
"What I've Been Looking For" – Drew & Vanessa
"What I've Been Looking For (Encore)" – Ashley & Lucas
"Bop To The Top" – Ashley & Lucas
"Breaking Free" – Drew & Vanessa
"We're All in This Together (Encore)" – Drew, Vanessa, Ashley, Lucas, Monique, Corbin, & Cast 

Disc 2 [DVD]
Five performances of High School Musical hits ("Start of Something New", "Get'cha Head in the Game", "Bop To The Top", "Breaking Free", "We're All in This Together")
Exclusive cast interviews (Concert Highlights DVD)
Preview for High School Musical: The Concert Extreme Access Pass

Video album
The Start Of Something New – Drew, Vanessa, Ashley, Lucas, Monique, & Corbin
Stick To The Status Quo – Drew, Vanessa, Ashley, Lucas, & Cast
I Can't Take My Eyes Off Of You – Drew, Vanessa, Ashley, Lucas, Monique, & Corbin
When There Was Me And You – Vanessa
We'll Be Together – Ashley
Get'cha Head in the Game – Drew & Corbin (with backup dancers)
Push It To the Limit – Corbin Bleu
Marchin' – Corbin
What I've Been Looking For (Version A) – Drew & Vanessa
What I've Been Looking For (Version B) – Ashley & Lucas
Say OK – Vanessa
Bop To The Top – Ashley & Lucas
Breakin' Free –  Drew & Vanessa
We're All in This Together (Encore) – Drew, Vanessa, Ashley, Lucas, Monique, Corbin, & Cast 
Bonus tracks
Jordan Pruitt's show-opening act ("Jump to the Rhythm", "Teenager", "Outside Looking In", "Miss Popularity")
High School Musical: On the Road
U Direct ("Start of Something New", "Get'cha Head in the Game", "Bop To The Top", "Breaking Free", "We're All in This Together")
High School Musical 2 trailer

Chart positions

Weekly charts

Year-end charts

See also 
 High School Musical
 High School Musical 2
 High School Musical 3: Senior Year
 High School Musical: El desafio (Argentina)

Notes

References

External links 
 
 High School Musical: The Concert – official DVD site
 High School Musical: The Concert – official tour site
 High School Musical: The Concert – Disney Channel tour site

2006 concert tours
2007 concert tours
High School Musical (franchise) mass media
2007 live albums